
Year 465 (CDLXV) was a common year starting on Friday (link will display the full calendar) of the Julian calendar. At the time, it was known as the Year of the Consulship of Hermenericus and Basiliscus (or, less frequently, year 1218 Ab urbe condita). The denomination 465 for this year has been used since the early medieval period, when the Anno Domini calendar era became the prevalent method in Europe for naming years.

Events 
 By place 

 Roman Empire 
 Basiliscus, with the help of his sister Verina (wife of emperor Leo I), becomes a consul in the Eastern Roman Empire.
 August 15 – Libius Severus, puppet emperor of the Western Roman Empire, dies after a 4-year reign. 
 September 2 – A fire begins in Constantinople and, over the next six days, destroys the buildings in eight of the 14 sections into which the Eastern Roman Imperial capital had been divided.
 Ricimer, de facto ruler, establishes political control for 2 years from his residence in Rome.

 Britannia 
 Battle of Wippedesfleot: The Saxons under command of Hengist and Aesc are defeated by the Britons near Ebbsfleet (Kent). During the battle 12 Welsh leaders are killed (according to the Anglo-Saxon Chronicle).

 Europe 
 King Remismund establishes a policy of friendship with the Visigoths, and promotes the conversion of the Suebi into Arianism in Galicia (Northern Spain).  

 China 
 Qian Fei Di, then Ming Di, becomes ruler of the Liu Song Dynasty after his nephew is assassinated.

 By topic 

 Religion 
 November 19 – Pope Hilarius convokes a synod at Rome's Church of Santa Maria Maggiore. 
 Peter the Fuller becomes patriarch of Antioch (approximate date).

Births 
 July 5 – Ahkal Mo' Naab' I, Maya ruler of Palenque (d. 524)
 Dubricius, bishop and saint (approximate date)
 Liberius, Roman aristocrat (approximate date)
 Procopius of Gaza, Christian sophist and rhetorician (approximate date)
 Severus, patriarch of Antioch (approximate date)

Deaths 
 May 5 – Gerontius, Archbishop of Milan
 June 20 – Wen Cheng Di, emperor of Northern Wei (b. 440)
 August 15 – Libius Severus, emperor of the Western Roman Empire
 Buliugu Li, official of the Northern Wei dynasty 
 Eógan mac Néill, king of Tír Eoghain (Ireland) 
 Liu Chuyu, princess of the Liu Song Dynasty

References